Fire Shark is a 1989 vertically scrolling shooter arcade video game developed and published by Toaplan in Japan and Europe, and by Romstar in North America. It is the sequel to Flying Shark, a game released in 1987 on multiple platforms. Set in the year 1991, the game focuses on a mysterious armada launching a worldwide attack from a small island in the Mediterranean Sea. Players take control of the titular biplane to counterattack the enemy forces.

Though first launched for the arcades, Fire Shark was ported in-house to the Mega Drive/Genesis and published worldwide by DreamWorks, Toaplan and Sega between 1990 and 1991. The console launch featured various changes compared with the original release. A conversion for the Sharp X68000 was developed but never released. The game was well received in arcades across Western regions where reviewers commended its graphics, sound and gameplay, however it proved to be less popular in Japan due to the high difficulty level. The Mega Drive/Genesis version was also met with mostly positive reviews from critics across multiple regions.

Gameplay 

Fire Shark is a military-themed vertically scrolling shoot 'em up game reminiscent of 1942, where players take control of the titular biplane through ten increasingly difficult levels in order to defeat an assortment of enemy forces like tanks, battleships, kamikaze monoplanes and artillery from the mysterious Strange Fleet armada. This is the main objective of the game. The game plays similarly like its predecessor, as players control their craft over a constantly scrolling background and the scenery never stops moving until an airport is reached. Players have two weapons at their disposal: the standard shot that travels a max distance of half the screen's height and bombs capable of obliterating any enemy caught within its blast radius.

There are three types of weapons to pick up that appear as colored icons by destroying zeppelins: a wide shot, a laser beam and a flamethrower. There are also other items like "S" icons that increases the overall speed, "B" icons that acts as extra bomb stocks, "P" icons and 1UPs on rare occasions. By acquiring three "P" icons in a row, players increase their plane's firepower to one level, with the third power level being the highest. Once the plane is fully powered up, grabbing additional icons grants extra points instead. Reaching high-scores is also crucial to obtain extra lives, which are obtained at certain score values. Players can grab lightning-shaped medals for points by destroying containers on the playfield.

Depending on the settings in the arcade version, the title uses either a checkpoint system in which a downed single player will start off at the beginning of the checkpoint they managed to reach before dying, or a respawn system where their ship immediately starts at the location they died at. Getting hit by enemy fire will result in losing a life, as well as a penalty of decreasing the ship's firepower and speed to his original state and once all lives are lost, the game is over unless the players insert more credits into the arcade machine to continue playing. Once all ten stages are complete, the game loops back to the first stage after completing the last stage as with previous titles from Toaplan, with each one increasing the difficulty and enemies fire denser bullet patterns.

Plot 
The plot summary of Fire Shark varies between each region and version. In the original arcade version, a mysterious enemy fleet known as the Strange Fleet arrived at a small island of the Mediterranean Sea during summer night in 1991, with few people noticing its sudden arrival. In the span of two years, the Strange Fleet grew larger and larger, culminating in a worldwide attack as a result. As the Strange Fleet continues their assault, those who oppose them cried "Fire Shark! Fire Shark! It's time to take-off!! Beat them for our sake. Go! Go! Fire Shark!". In the Sega Genesis port, the game takes place in the year 19X9 on an alternate Earth instead, where a global superpower known as the S Corps, which specializes in a heavy industrial army begins invading various countries, with all seemingly lost when a phantom pilot flying a super-powered biplane called the Fire Shark flies in to save the world from domination.

Development 

Fire Sharks development process and history was recounted between 1989 and 2012 through Japanese publications such as Shooting Gameside by former Toaplan composer Masahiro Yuge. Yuge acted as the game's composer, with Shintarō Nakaoka serving as artist, while both Sanae Nitō and Yuko Tataka were also involved in the production as designers, though none of the members in the development team were credited as such in neither version of the game.

The team wanted to convey "the same strengths" as its predecessor, Flying Shark, by adding elements like the flamethrower as a way to promote the game, with Yuge stating that the weapon acted as a successor to the blue laser in 1989's Truxton. However, Yuge later stated regrets in recent years for not balancing the game's difficulty for both arcade owners and players. The development team settled on using the word "same" when coming up for the project's title, which translates to "shark" in Japanese to convey a strong animal sound. Nakaoka was also responsible for drawing the crowd during the takeoff sequence at the beginning of the game that was, according to Yuge, later animated during their leisure for diversion.

Release 
Fire Shark was first released in arcades by Toaplan, in Japan on November 2, 1989 and then in Europe later the same year, followed by a North American release by Romstar in March 1990. On 21 October 1989, an album containing music from the title was co-published exclusively in Japan by Scitron and Pony Canyon. In October 1990, a Sega Genesis port of Fire Shark developed in-house by Toaplan was first released in North America by DreamWorks, which was a division of Toy Soldiers, Inc. It was released for the Mega Drive in Japan by Toaplan on 2 November of the same year, while Sega distributed the title across Europe in December 1991. The port stays faithful to the original arcade release and included a harder difficulty setting but has a number of key differences such as having a smaller color palette that lead to sprites being recolored in different ways, along with other presentation and gameplay changes from the original version. To promote the Mega Drive version, a TV advert was aired in Japan. A version for the Sharp X68000 was in development and planned to be published by Kaneko, however despite being advertised in Japanese publications such as Oh!X, this version was never released to the market for unknown reasons.

The Mega Drive/Genesis port was later re-released by independent publisher Retro-Bit in 2020. In 2022, the arcade version will be included in the Hishou Same! Same! Same! compilation for Nintendo Switch and PlayStation 4 as part of M2's Toaplan Arcade Garage label. The arcade original will also be included as part of the Sega Astro City Mini V, a vertically oriented variant of the Sega Astro City mini console.

Reception 

In Japan, Game Machine listed Fire Shark on their January 1, 1990 issue as being the fifth most-successful table arcade unit at the time. According to Masahiro Yuge, Fire Shark was well received in Western arcades but proved to be less popular in Japan due to its high difficulty.

German magazine Power Play compared it with 1943: The Battle of Midway and Vapor Trail: Hyper Offence Formation.

The Mega Drive/Genesis version was well received when it was released, earning a score of 33 out of 40 in Electronic Gaming Monthly.

Legacy 
The rights to Fire Shark, its predecessor and many other IPs from Toaplan are now owned by Tatsujin, a company named after Truxtons Japanese title that was founded in 2017 by Yuge, who are now affiliated with arcade manufacturer exA-Arcadia. Artist Perry "Gryzor/Rozyrg" Sessions cited Fire Shark as one of the main influences for Super XYX.

Notes

References

External links 

 Fire Shark at GameFAQs
 Fire Shark at Giant Bomb
 Fire Shark at Killer List of Videogames
 Fire Shark at MobyGames
 Fire Shark at The Toaplan Museum

1989 video games
Arcade video games
Cancelled X68000 games
Cooperative video games
Multiplayer and single-player video games
Romstar games
Sega video games
Sega Genesis games
Shoot 'em ups
Toaplan games
Vertically scrolling shooters
Video game sequels
Video games scored by Masahiro Yuge
Video games set in 1991
Video games set in the 1990s
Video games set in the 20th century
War video games
Video games developed in Japan